Convexity is an important topic in economics. In the Arrow–Debreu model of general economic equilibrium, agents have convex budget sets and convex preferences: At equilibrium prices, the budget hyperplane supports the best attainable indifference curve. The profit function is the convex conjugate of the cost function. Convex analysis is the standard tool for analyzing textbook economics. Non‑convex phenomena in economics have been studied with nonsmooth analysis, which generalizes convex analysis.

Preliminaries

The economics depends upon the following definitions and results from convex geometry.

Real vector spaces

A real vector space of two dimensions may be given a Cartesian coordinate system in which every point is identified by a list of two real numbers, called "coordinates", which are conventionally denoted by x and y. Two points in the Cartesian plane can be added coordinate-wise
 (x1, y1) + (x2, y2) = (x1+x2, y1+y2);
further, a point can be multiplied by each real number λ coordinate-wise 
 λ (x, y) = (λx, λy).

More generally, any real vector space of (finite) dimension D can be viewed as the set of all possible lists of D real numbers  } together with two operations: vector addition and multiplication by a real number. For finite-dimensional vector spaces, the operations of vector addition and real-number multiplication can each be defined coordinate-wise, following the example of the Cartesian plane.

Convex sets

In a real vector space, a set is defined to be convex if, for each pair of its points, every point on the line segment that joins them is covered by the set. For example, a solid cube is convex; however, anything that is hollow or dented, for example, a crescent shape, is non‑convex. Trivially, the empty set is convex.

More formally, a set Q is convex if, for all points v0 and v1 in Q and for every real number λ in the unit interval , the point 
 (1 − λ) v0 + λv1
is a member of Q.

By mathematical induction, a set Q is convex if and only if every convex combination of members of Q also belongs to Q. By definition, a convex combination of an indexed subset {v0, v1, . . . , vD} of a vector space is any weighted average  for some indexed set of non‑negative real numbers {λd} satisfying the equation  = 1.

The definition of a convex set implies that the intersection of two convex sets is a convex set. More generally, the intersection of a family of convex sets is a convex set.

Convex hull
For every subset Q of a real vector space, its  is the minimal convex set that contains Q. Thus Conv(Q) is the intersection of all the convex sets that cover Q. The convex hull of a set can be equivalently defined to be the set of all convex combinations of points in Q.

Duality: Intersecting half-spaces

Supporting hyperplane is a concept in geometry. A hyperplane divides a space into two half-spaces. A hyperplane is said to support a set  in the real n-space  if it meets both of the following:
  is entirely contained in one of the two closed half-spaces determined by the hyperplane
  has at least one point on the hyperplane.
Here, a closed half-space is the half-space that includes the hyperplane.

Supporting hyperplane theorem

The hyperplane in the theorem may not be unique, as noticed in the second picture on the right.

Economics

An optimal basket of goods occurs where the consumer's convex preference set is supported by the budget constraint, as shown in the diagram. If the preference set is convex, then the consumer's set of optimal decisions is a convex set, for example, a unique optimal basket (or even a line segment of optimal baskets).

For simplicity, we shall assume that the preferences of a consumer can be described by a utility function that is a continuous function, which implies that the preference sets are closed. (The meanings of "closed set" is explained below, in the subsection on optimization applications.)

Non-convexity

If a preference set is non‑convex, then some prices produce a budget supporting two different optimal consumption decisions. For example, we can imagine that, for zoos, a lion costs as much as an eagle, and further that a zoo's budget suffices for one eagle or one lion. We can suppose also that a zoo-keeper views either animal as equally valuable. In this case, the zoo would purchase either one lion or one eagle. Thus, the contemporary zoo-keeper's preferences are non‑convex: The zoo-keeper prefers having either animal to having any strictly convex combination of both.

Non‑convex sets have been incorporated in the theories of general economic equilibria, of market failures, and of public economics. These results are described in graduate-level textbooks in microeconomics, general equilibrium theory, game theory, mathematical economics,
and applied mathematics (for economists). The Shapley–Folkman lemma results establish that non‑convexities are compatible with approximate equilibria in markets with many consumers; these results also apply to production economies with many small firms.

In "oligopolies" (markets dominated by a few producers), especially in "monopolies" (markets dominated by one producer), non‑convexities remain important. Concerns with large producers exploiting market power in fact initiated the literature on non‑convex sets, when Piero Sraffa wrote about on firms with increasing returns to scale in 1926, after which Harold Hotelling wrote about marginal cost pricing in 1938. Both Sraffa and Hotelling illuminated the market power of producers without competitors, clearly stimulating a literature on the supply-side of the economy.
Non‑convex sets arise also with environmental goods (and other externalities), with information economics, and with stock markets (and other incomplete markets). Such applications continued to motivate economists to study non‑convex sets.

Nonsmooth analysis

Economists have increasingly studied non‑convex sets with nonsmooth analysis, which generalizes convex analysis. Economists have also used algebraic topology.

See also
 Convex duality

Notes

References
 
 
 
 
 
 
 Luenberger, David G. Microeconomic Theory, McGraw-Hill, Inc., New York, 1995.
 
 
 
 .
 

Convex hulls
Convex geometry
General equilibrium theory